Gao Pei (died 212) was a military general serving under Liu Zhang, ruler of Yi Province (present-day Sichuan and Chongqing), during the Three Kingdoms period of China.

Life
Little is known of Gao Pei, except that he was assigned along with Yang Huai to guard Boshui Pass (白水關) from Zhang Lu in case he was to attack.

However, when Liu Bei entered Liu Zhang's Yi Province on the pretext of defending Liu Zhang from the warlords Zhang Lu and Cao Cao, he had the intention of taking Yi Province. Liu Bei followed the second plan of his advisor Pang Tong to first take control of Liu Zhang's armies in the north, then move to capture the capital of Chengdu. As a first step, Liu Bei entered Boshui Pass by catching Gao and Yang off guard, and before reinforcements could arrive, Gao and Yang were executed on the pretext that they were being disrespectful to Liu Bei. Liu Bei took the pass's garrison into his army, and proceeded to attack Fu County (涪縣; in present-day Fuling District, Chongqing).

In Romance of the Three Kingdoms
In the 14th-century historical novel Romance of the Three Kingdoms, When Liu Bei arrived at the pass, both Gao Pei and Yang Huai had faked their surrendering, and planned on assassinating Liu Bei, however, Pang Tong's insight had revealed their intentions to Liu Bei, so Gao Pei and Yang Huai were executed.

See also
 Lists of people of the Three Kingdoms

Notes

References 

 Chen, Shou (3rd century). Records of the Three Kingdoms (Sanguozhi).
 Pei, Songzhi (5th century). Annotations to Records of the Three Kingdoms (Sanguozhi zhu).

2nd-century births
212 deaths
Executed Han dynasty people
Liu Zhang and associates
3rd-century executions
People executed by the Han dynasty
Year of birth missing